The Transylvanian Saxon literature is a form of literature which represents the totality of literary works written in the Transylvanian Saxon dialect (a dialect of the German language spoken in Transylvania, contemporary central Romania since the High Middle Ages onwards to the present-day) and Standard German by various Transylvanian Saxon writers in the passing of time. These literary works include both those written in prose and in the lyrical genre, from folk tales to poems and prayers. Additionally, the Transylvanian Saxon literature, in a larger sense, can also included works written by Transylvanian Saxon writers in Latin and Romanian.

The Transylvanian Saxon literature can be perceived as a branch of the German literature in Central and Eastern Europe, but also written in a specific dialect and not only in the standard form of the German language (i.e. Hochdeutsch). Renowned Transylvanian Saxon writers include Josef/Joseph Haltrich (a high school in Sighișoara/Schäßburg has been bearing his name to this day) and Dutz Schuster (who is regarded as the counterpart of Ion Luca Caragiale in Transylvanian Saxon literature). The Transylvanian Saxon literature is part of both the Romanian literature and the German literature.

Background 

The literature of the Transylvanian Saxons, a group of the German diaspora since the Middle Ages, has evolved in Transylvania in their own dialect in the passing of time. Initially however, during the Middle Ages, many documents by Transylvanian Saxon authors were written in Latin given the fact that Latin was the language of the Roman Catholic Church and the Roman Catholic Church in Transylvania was 'the main actor of literate communication' back then. At the same time and later on during the Modern Age, more documents in standard German (i.e. Hochdeutsch) were more prevalent than the ones written in the Transylvanian Saxon dialect. 

Subsequently, traditional ballads (e.g. De Råch/The Rache/The Revenge) and ecclesiastical texts such as Our Father (i.e. Foater auser in Transylvanian Saxon) have been compiled and published. They were followed by compilations of folk tales by Josef Haltrich (in the style of those written by Brothers Grimm) and other literary works such as those by Dutz Schuster. The high school in Sighișoara has been bearing the name of Josef Haltrich for over 200 years.

Notable Transylvanian Saxon writers 

Below is a list of notable Transylvanian Saxon writers who wrote in Latin, the Transylvanian Saxon dialect, or in Standard German (i.e. Hochdeutsch):

 Johannes Honterus
 Christian Schesaeus
 Joseph Haltrich
 Gustav Schuster (Schuster Dutz)
 Stephan Ludwig Roth
 George Maurer
 Adolf Meschendörfer
 Claus Stephani

Another notable writer of Transylvanian Saxon/German descent from Transylvania (albeit partial), but who has been writing in Romanian, is Nicolae Breban.

Gallery

References 

German literature
Romanian literature
Transylvanian Saxon people
German diaspora in Europe
Ethnic German groups in Romania
Transylvania